Bordj Okhriss District is a district of Bouïra Province, Algeria.

Municipalities
The district is further divided into 4 municipalities:
Bordj Okhriss
Mezdour 
Taguedit
Hadjera Zerga

Districts of Bouïra Province